Amadou Coulibaly (born 31 December 1984) is a Burkinabé former professional footballer who played as a right back.

Club career
Coulibaly played youth football for RC Bobo Dioulasso, before moving to Stade Rennais F.C. and Grenoble Foot 38 in France. He also played for Zemplín Michalovce in Slovakia and KV Oostende in Belgium.

International career
Coulibaly represented the Burkina Faso national team at the 2001 FIFA U-17 World Championship and 2003 FIFA World Youth Championship, where the team finished top of Group A, but lost to Canada in the round of 16.

He was a member of the Burkinabé 2004 African Nations Cup team, who finished bottom of their group in the first round of the competition, thus failing to secure qualification for the quarter-finals.

References

External links
 
 
 

Living people
1984 births
People from Bobo-Dioulasso
Burkinabé footballers
Association football defenders
Burkina Faso international footballers
2004 African Cup of Nations players
Ligue 2 players
Championnat National 3 players
Stade Rennais F.C. players
Grenoble Foot 38 players
MFK Zemplín Michalovce players
2. Liga (Slovakia) players
RC Bobo Dioulasso players
K.V. Oostende players
FC Échirolles players
Burkinabé expatriate footballers
Burkinabé expatriate sportspeople in France
Expatriate footballers in France
Burkinabé expatriate sportspeople in Slovakia
Expatriate footballers in Slovakia
Burkinabé expatriate sportspeople in Belgium
Expatriate footballers in Belgium
21st-century Burkinabé people